Barbara was an unincorporated community in Fayetteville Township, Washington County, Arkansas, United States. It was annexed by Fayetteville in 1967. It is located on the Frisco Railway and Gregg Avenue in Fayetteville.

References

Populated places in Washington County, Arkansas
Former populated places in Arkansas